Polo is a masculine given name. Notable people with the name include:

 Polo Carrera (born 1945), Ecuadorian footballer
 Polo Hofer (born 1945), Swiss musician
 Polo Villaamil (born 1979), Spanish auto racing drive
 Polo Wila (born 1987), Ecuadorian footballer

Masculine given names